{{DISPLAYTITLE:C22H42O4}}
The molecular formula C22H42O4 (molar mass: 370.56 g/mol) may refer to:

 Bis(2-ethylhexyl) adipate
 Dioctyl adipate
 Docosanedioic acid

Molecular formulas